Muhammad Farhan bin Roslan (born 3 December 1996) is a Malaysian footballer who plays for Sabah FC in the Malaysia Super League as an  attacking midfielder.

Club career

Kedah Darul Aman
He was registered and played with the Kedah President's Cup team in 2013 and also played for Kedah futsal team. In the next seasons, he was called up by Kedah's head coach, Ian Gillan for Kedah senior team for 2014 Malaysia Premier League. Farhan signed a three-year deal which ends in 2017.

International career
Farhan received national call-up for international friendly match after he put in some promising performances in the Malaysia Cup. But he was never selected for the AFF Suzuki Cup squad by coach Dollah Salleh.

Career statistics

Club

Honour

Club
Kedah Darul Aman
 Malaysia Premier League: 2015
 Malaysian FA Cup: 2017, 2019
 Malaysia Cup: 2016
 Malaysia Charity Shield: 2017

Individual
 Malaysia Best Young Players: 2014

References

External links
 

1996 births
Living people
Malaysian footballers
Kedah Darul Aman F.C. players
Sabah F.C. (Malaysia) players
People from Kedah
Malaysian people of Malay descent
Association football wingers